Melica onoei is a species of grass found in China, Japan, Korea, Pakistan and Taiwan.

Description
The species is perennial and have elongated rhizomes. The species leaf-sheaths are tubular and smooth with one of their length being closed. Both the leaf-sheaths and leaf-blades have glabrous surface.

Florets are diminished at the apex.

Both the lower and upper glumes are elliptic, keelless, membranous, and have acute apexes. Palea is 2-veined. Flowers are fleshy, oblong, truncate, have 2 lodicules, and grow together.

Ecology
It blooms from May to October.

References

onoei
Grasses of China
Flora of Japan
Flora of Korea
Flora of Pakistan
Flora of Taiwan